Pont-de-Ruan is a commune in the Indre-et-Loire department in central France.

It is known for picturesque water mills and goat cheese, and Balzac champions its beauty in The Lily of the Valley.

Population

See also
Communes of the Indre-et-Loire department

References

Communes of Indre-et-Loire